Gabriel Romero may refer to:

 Gabriel Romero (actor), Mexican actor
 Gabriel Romero (footballer), Argentine midfielder